Statistics of Swedish football Division 1 in season 1987.

Overview
It was contested by 28 teams, and Djurgårdens IF and GAIS won the championship.

League standings

Norra

Södra

Footnotes

References
Sweden - List of final tables (Clas Glenning)

Swedish Football Division 1 seasons
2
Sweden
Sweden